Brian Óge Ó hUiginn, Irish poet, died 1505.

Brian Óge was a member of a branch of the Ó hUiginn brehon family.

The Annals of the Four Masters recorded his death, sub anno 1505, as follows:

 Brian Oge, the son of Brian, son of Donnell Cam O'Higgin, died. Mentioned in the same obituary was his kinsman, Cairbre mac Brian Ó hUiginn.

External links
 http://www.ucc.ie/celt/published/T100005D/

Medieval Irish poets
People from County Sligo
People from County Mayo
People from County Galway
16th-century Irish writers
Medieval Irish writers
1505 deaths
Year of birth unknown
15th-century Irish poets
16th-century Irish poets
Irish male poets